Confrontation is the follow-up to the self-titled 1984 debut album of the Boston new wave band Face to Face.

While the previous album had edgier elements, like the rap in "Under The Gun", Confrontation was starting to move away from that style. Because of that, this release can be seen as a bridge between the debut and their next (and final) album One Big Day. Like the 1984 debut, most of the songs were written by Angelo, with Laurie Sargent credited as co-writer on half. This record was not a commercial success and would be their last release on Epic Records. Many vinyl pressings in circulation can be found with a gold promo stamp on the back cover, making the non-promo copy more desirable to collectors due to its rarity.

"Tell Me Why" was released as a single in The United States. No promotional video was released.

Reissue
Epic Records made this available on Compact Disc in Japan exclusively. In 2006, the independent label Wounded Bird Records (woundedbird.com) issued the album on CD for the first time ever in the United States.

Track listing
"Tell Me Why" (4:40)
"Confess" (3:28)
"Why Do I Say" (4:18)
"Too Late" (3:23)
"The 4th Watch" (5:05)
"Walk Into the Fire" (4:09)
"When Time Stands Still" (3:44)
"Shake the World" (4:27)
"A Boy Like You" (3:42)
"America's Dream" (4:18)

1985 albums
Face to Face (new wave band) albums
Albums produced by Ed Stasium
Albums produced by Arthur Baker (musician)
Epic Records albums